The Covell Street School (or Joslin Multi-Service Center) is an historic school building at 231 Amherst Street in Providence, Rhode Island.  It is a two-story wood-frame structure built in a typically elaborate Queen Anne style.  Although it is basically rectangular in plan, its roofline and exterior are busy, with a complicated group of cross gables, hip-roof sections, with projecting and recessed sections.  A three-story square tower rises from the center of the main facade.  Built in 1885 and opened in 1886, it is one of Providence's last surviving 19th-century neighborhood school buildings.  It was designed by the local firm of William R. Walker & Son, designers of many Rhode Island civic buildings.  The builders were John L. Sprague & Company.

The building was listed on the National Register of Historic Places in 1976.

See also
National Register of Historic Places listings in Providence, Rhode Island

References

School buildings on the National Register of Historic Places in Rhode Island
Schools in Providence County, Rhode Island
Buildings and structures in Providence, Rhode Island
National Register of Historic Places in Providence, Rhode Island
School buildings completed in 1886
Queen Anne architecture in Rhode Island